The marsh mongoose (Atilax paludinosus), also known as the water mongoose or the vansire, is a medium-sized mongoose native to sub-Saharan Africa that inhabits foremost freshwater wetlands. It has been listed as Least Concern on the IUCN Red List since 2008.

Taxonomy 
The generic name Atilax was introduced in 1826 by Frédéric Cuvier.
In 1829, Georges Cuvier referred to a mongoose in the marshes of the Cape Province using the scientific name Herpestes paludinosus.
It is the only extant member of the genus Atilax, although an extinct ancestral species from the Early Pleistocene known as Atilax mesotes was also a member of the genus.

Characteristics
The marsh mongoose's fur is dark reddish brown to black with white and fawn coloured guard hairs. The hair behind the neck and in front of the back is short, but longer on the hind legs and on the tail. Its muzzle is short with a fawn coloured mouth, short whiskers and a naked rhinarium. It has  teeth. Its short ears are round. It has two nipples. Its feet have five flexible digits each with curved claws, but without any webbing. The soles of its feet are naked.

Both sexes have anal glands in a pouch that produce a musky smelling secretion.

Female marsh mongooses have 36 chromosomes, and males 35, as one Y chromosome is translocated to an autosome.

Distribution and habitat
The marsh mongoose occurs in sub-Saharan Africa from Senegal to Ethiopia, and south to Southern Africa, except Namibia.
It inhabits freshwater wetlands such as marshes and swamps along slow-moving rivers and streams, but also estuaries in coastal areas.
It was probably introduced to Pemba Island in the Zanzibar Archipelago.

In Guinea's National Park of Upper Niger, it was recorded during surveys conducted in 1996 to 1997.
In Gabon's Moukalaba-Doudou National Park, it was recorded only in forested habitats during a two-months survey in 2012.

Behaviour and ecology
The marsh mongoose is solitary.
It is an excellent swimmer and can dive for up to 15 seconds, using its feet to paddle. On land, it usually trots slowly, but can also move fast.
Radio-collared marsh mongooses in KwaZulu-Natal showed crepuscular activity, and were active from shortly after sunset until after midnight, but not during the day.
A male marsh mongoose radio-collared in Dzanga-Sangha Special Reserve was most active in early mornings and late evenings. During the day it rested in burrows situated in dry areas above water and mud in dense cover of high grasses and climbing plants.

Feeding behaviour and diet
Feeding behaviour of eight captive marsh mongooses was studied in 1984. When the mongooses sighted prey in the water, they swam or walked towards it, used their digits to seek it out, but kept their heads above water. Once located, they grabbed it with the mouth and killed it outside the water. They killed rodents and frogs by biting them in the head, and occasionally also shook them. When finished eating, they wiped their mouths with the forefeet. They broke eggs by throwing them backwards between the legs.
Scat of marsh mongooses collected around Lake St Lucia contained foremost remains of crustaceans, amphibians, insects and fish. Marsh mongooses were observed while carrying mudcrabs (Scylla serrata) ashore. They removed the chelipeds and opened the sternum to feed on the body contents.
They deposit scat at specific latrine sites located on low shrubs, on rocks or sand well away from the water edge. Scat of marsh mongoose collected in a rocky coastal habitat contained remains of sandhoppers, shore crab (Cyclograpsus punctatus), pink-lipped topshell (Oxystele sinensis) and Tropidophora snails.
Research in southeastern Nigeria revealed that the marsh mongoose has an omnivorous diet. It feeds on rodents like giant pouched rats (Cricetomys), Temminck's mouse (Mus musculoides), Tullberg's soft-furred mouse (Praomys tulbergi), grass frogs (Ptychadena), crowned bullfrog (Hoplobatrachus occipitalis), herald snake (Crotaphopeltis hotamboeia), mudskippers (Periophthalmus), insects such as spiders and Coleoptera, snails and slugs, Bivalvia, Decapoda as well as fruits, berries and seeds.

Reproduction
After a gestation of 69 to 80 days, females give birth to a litter of two to three young, which are fully furred. Their eyes open between the 9th and 14th day, pupils are bluish at first and change to brown at the age of three weeks. Their ear canal opens between the 17th and 28th day. Females start weaning their offspring earliest on the 30th day, and young are fully weaned by the age of two months.

Threats
In 2006, it was estimated that about 950 marsh mongooses are hunted yearly in the Cameroon part of the Cross–Sanaga–Bioko coastal forests.

References

External links

Picture of a marsh mongoose

marsh mongoose
Mammals of Sub-Saharan Africa
Mammals of Cameroon
Mammals of the Democratic Republic of the Congo
Mammals of Ethiopia
Mammals of Gabon
marsh mongoose
marsh mongoose